James M. Letherer (December 30, 1933 – December 18, 2001), born and died in Saginaw, Michigan, better known as Jim Letherer, was an American civil rights activist.  He walked on crutches the entire 54 miles of the 1965 Selma to Montgomery march for voting rights, and in 1966 walked with Martin Luther King Jr. in James Meredith's Mississippi March Against Fear. Letherer lost his right leg to cancer when he was ten years old. Letherer has received honors by the Selma to Montgomery Interpretive Center Museum in Alabama, which hosts a life-size statue of him.

 He received mention and a verse in a book by Pete Seeger:

Letherer was involved with a march to aid cancer research in 1984, and in 1985 he joined the 20-year reunion of the Selma to Montgomery march participants in Selma, Alabama.

References

External links
  Uncle Jim Letherer Martin Luther King Selma - Montgomery March Jimmy Letherer Paul

1933 births
2001 deaths
American civil rights activists
Nonviolence advocates
American amputees
American Jews
Selma to Montgomery marches